Chopicalqui or Chopicallqui (possibly from Huaylas Quechua Chawpi "center" kallki "ravine") is a mountain in the Cordillera Blanca area in the Andes of Peru. It lies in Yungay Province, Ancash, between the mountains Huascarán and Contrahierbas.

Climbing 
The standard climbing route is the Southwest Ridge, a moderate snow climb that is popular with climbers and can be crowded at times. It possesses a difficulty rating of PD+/AD- on the French System for grading alpine routes but deep snow on the summit slopes causes most failures for parties attempting the ridge.

Other established climbing routes include the following:
 Southeast Ridge (alpine grade TD-).
 East Face Direct (alpine grade TD).

References 

Mountains of Peru
Mountains of Ancash Region
Six-thousanders of the Andes